Fotbal Club Olt Scornicești, commonly known as FC Olt Scornicești, Olt Scornicești or simply as FC Olt, is a Romanian football club based in Scornicești, Olt County. Founded in 1972, it soon became one of the best teams from a rural area, also representing the home village of former dictator Nicolae Ceaușescu and arguably receiving "extra help" to reach Divizia A and remain there. After the Romanian Revolution the club was relegated by the Romanian Football Federation and struggled to stay solvent.

FC Olt is currently playing in the Liga IV, Olt County series.

Chronology of names

History
The club represented the home village of former dictator Nicolae Ceaușescu, arguably receiving "extra help" to reach Divizia A and remain there. In 1974 promoted in Divizia C, 1978 in Divizia B and then, after only one year they reached the first division. It is well known an episode from the last round of the 1978–1979 Divizia B season, when to succeed promotion on goal difference, they defeated Electrodul Slatina with 18–0, it also says that at that game, Dumitru Dragomir, the president of the club at that time, brought out both teams from the showers on the field to score a few more goals, that after he misunderstood the result of the other match. However, after the fall of the communist regime, the club lost its main support and was excluded from championship, the same thing happened with the other clubs which were supported by the communist regime, like Victoria București (police team) or Flacăra Moreni (securitate team) since then, FC Olt did not manage to play at a higher level than Liga II.

Honours
Liga I:
Winners (0):, Best Finish: 4th 1981–82
Liga II:
Winners (1): 1978–79
Liga III:
Winners (2): 1977–78, 1990–91
Liga IV – Olt County
Winners (3): 1973–74, 1995–96, 2002–03
Runners-up (1): 1994–95

Notable former players

Notable managers
  Florin Halagian
  Marian Bondrea
  Leonte Ianovschi
  Florian Dumitrescu
  Victor Dinuț

References

External links
 

Football clubs in Olt County
Association football clubs established in 1972
Liga I clubs
Liga II clubs
Liga III clubs
Liga IV clubs
1972 establishments in Romania